The following is a list of the 15 cantons of the Haute-Corse department, in France, following the French canton reorganisation which came into effect in March 2015:

 Bastia-1 
 Bastia-2 
 Bastia-3 
 Bastia-4 
 Biguglia-Nebbio
 Borgo
 Calvi
 Cap Corse
 Casinca-Fumalto
 Castagniccia
 Corte
 Fiumorbo-Castello
 Ghisonaccia
 Golo-Morosaglia
 L'Île-Rousse

References

 
Haute-Corse-related lists